Ninsiima Ronah Rita (born 31 March 1978) Is a Ugandan politician and journalist who was the women representative member of parliament for Kabale District in the 9th Parliament of  Uganda. She beat former agriculture minister Hope Mwesigye who had represented the constituency since 1994 in the 2011 Uganda general elections on February 18 replacing her for the seat between 2011 and 2016. Rita was an independent candidate after losing the National Resistance Movement (NRM) primaries to Hope Mwesigye.

Biography 
Rita was born in a polygamous family. She took her O-levels at Kigezi High School and received a diploma in Business Management from International Professions Academy in Kabale district in 1997. She worked at Kigezi Private Sector Promotion Centre and later at Voice of Kigezi radio in 2000 where she co-hosted a programme called "Ruhondeza". In 2005, Rita took a job as a news anchor at Radio West in Mbarara before becoming a politician in 2011. Rita lost the seat to Catherina Ndamira Atwikiire for the Women Representative member of Parliament for Kabale District in the 10th Parliament of  Uganda in 2016.

Personal life 
Rita contracted COVID-19 on 7 September 2021. After surviving, Rita was said to have given her life to God.

See also 
 List of members of the ninth Parliament of Uganda
 Hope Mwesigye
 Catherina Ndamira Atwikiire

References

External links 
 Kabale District Local Government

Living people
People from Kabale District
Women members of the Parliament of Uganda
Members of the Parliament of Uganda
21st-century Ugandan politicians
21st-century Ugandan women politicians
Mbarara University alumni
1978 births